The Waking Hour is the first album by English band Dali's Car, a project of Peter Murphy of Bauhaus and Mick Karn of Japan. It was released in November 1984 by record label Paradox, which was created specifically to release the record (it was later reissued on Beggars Banquet).

Content 
The album's cover is the painting Daybreak by Maxfield Parrish, which was also utilized by The Moody Blues for the cover of The Present in 1983.

Reception 

Trouser Press wrote: "As a mellifluous noise, The Waking Hour is fine, if a bit heavy on the bass; dig any deeper, however, and what you get is a hollow attempt to create art without any redeeming artistry."

Fact magazine included it in their list "20 best goth records ever made".

Track listing

Personnel 
 Dalis Car

 Mick Karn – instrumentation (except percussion), production, design
 Peter Murphy – vocals, lyrics, production
 Paul Lawford – percussion, drums

 Additional personnel
 Matt Butler – engineering and mixing
 Stuart Breed – mixing
 Steve Churchyard – production, mixing, engineering
 Fin Costello – album photography
 Rory Lonemore – engineering
 Maxfield Parrish – cover painting (detail from Daybreak)
 Sheila Rock – album photography

References

External links 
 

1984 debut albums
Beggars Banquet Records albums
Dalis Car albums